The 1999 Pattaya Women's Open singles was the tennis singles event of the tenth edition of the most prestigious tournament in Thailand. Qualifier and former World No. 4 Magdalena Maleeva won the title, defeating Anne Kremer in the final to claim her first in four years.

Seeds

Draw

Finals

Top half

Bottom half

Qualifying

Seeds

Qualifiers

Qualifying draw

First qualifier

Second qualifier

Third qualifier

Fourth qualifier

References
 ITF singles results page

Singles
Pattaya Women's Open - Singles
 in women's tennis